Joseph Nicholls (14 April 1859 – 27 July 1954) was a New Zealand cricketer. He played one first-class match for Otago in 1876/77.

See also
 List of Otago representative cricketers

References

External links
 

1859 births
1954 deaths
New Zealand cricketers
Otago cricketers
Cricketers from Launceston, Tasmania